Physalaemus fernandezae is a species of frog in the family Leptodactylidae.
It is found in Argentina, Uruguay, and possibly Brazil.
Its natural habitats are subtropical or tropical seasonally wet or flooded lowland grassland, intermittent freshwater marshes, and rocky areas.
It is threatened by habitat loss.

References

fernandezae
Taxonomy articles created by Polbot
Amphibians described in 1926